National Egg Coordination Committee (NECC) is an association of poultry farmers in India with a membership of more than 25,000 farmers. In the past two decades, NECC has played a significant role for the betterment of the poultry industry in general, and the egg industry in particular, through its various programmes like market intervention, price support operations, egg promotion campaigns, consumer education, market research, rural market development and liaisons with the government on vital issues concerning the industry

Objectives
NECC has vast objectives to play significant role in Indian Egg industry which mainly focus on Egg Pricing. After fulfilling its original purpose NECC expanded its scope of activities to achieve the following.
On bases of reasonable price for customer, decent margin for middleman and fair return to farmer, it declares the egg Price.
Monitoring, managing, regulating the stocks from surplus to deficit regions
Market intervention through Agrocorpex India Limited.
Having a dependable and close network of marketeers that use multi level marketing to sell the products.
Promote egg trade, egg farm, egg exports .
Make available the technology and information for increased production of eggs.

History
The Indian Poultry industry suffered an unusual series of crises in early 1980s, as the selling price had become lower than the production cost. Many of the poultry farmers shut down their farm operations as a result of heavy losses. A group of farmers motivated by Dr. B. V. Rao and Ch. Jagapati Rao traveled across the country, organizing over 300 meetings with groups, individuals, and traders. Their objective was to unite poultry farmers from all over India and take control of their own destiny. In May 1982, NECC was formally registered as a trust under the Indian Societies Registration Act and on May 14, 1982, NECC started declaring egg prices.

References

Poultry industry in India
Organizations established in 1982
Agricultural organisations based in India
Egg organizations
1982 establishments in Andhra Pradesh
Organisations based in Hyderabad, India